Theodosia is a genus of beetles from the family Scarabaeidae, subfamily Cetoniinae, tribe Phaedimini.

List of species
 Theodosia antoinei Nagai, 1998
 Theodosia chewi Ochi, 1993
 Theodosia howitti Castelnau, 1873
 Theodosia katsurai Sakai, 1994
 Theodosia magnifica Rotschild & Jordan, 1893
 Theodosia maindroni Bourgoin, 1910
 Theodosia miyashitai Sakai, 1997
 Theodosia nobuyukii Nagai, 1998
 Theodosia perakenis Moser, 1901
 Theodosia pilosipygidialis Nagai, 1998
 Theodosia rodorigezi Nagai, 1980
 Theodosia telifer Bates, 1889
 Theodosia viridiaurata (Bates, 1889)

References
 Zipcodezoo

Cetoniinae